Kiru (also Romanized as Kīrū; also known as Kaguran (Persian: کيگوران), also Romanized as Kagūrān and Kīgūrān) is a village in Zaz-e Sharqi Rural District, Zaz va Mahru District, Aligudarz County, Lorestan Province, Iran. At the 2006 census, its population was 207, in 33 families.

References 

Towns and villages in Aligudarz County